Shawn Davis (born December 24, 1997) is an American football strong safety who is a free agent. He played college football at Florida.

Early life and high school
Davis grew up in Miami, Florida and attended Miami Southridge High School. Davis committed to play college football at Florida over an offer from Miami.

College career
Davis played mostly as a reserve and on special teams as a true freshman. Davis missed the first month of his sophomore season due to injury and finished the year with 22 tackles, two tackles for loss and five passes broken up. As a junior, he recorded 51 tackles, one tackle for loss, three passes defended, and three interceptions. He was named SEC player of the Week after making a one-handed interception against Auburn, which he returned for 41 yards. Davis was ejected from Florida's season opener during his senior season for targeting.

Professional career

Indianapolis Colts
Davis was drafted by the Indianapolis Colts in the fifth round, 165th overall, of the 2021 NFL Draft. On May 6, 2021, Davis officially signed with the Colts. He was waived on August 31, 2021, and re-signed to the practice squad the next day. On September 16, 2021, Davis was released from the practice squad.

Green Bay Packers
On September 21, 2021, Davis signed with the Green Bay Packers practice squad. On December 18, he was signed to the active roster. On December 25, Davis made his NFL debut in the Packers' week 16 game against the Cleveland Browns, logging an assisted tackle in the 24–22 victory. He was waived/injured on August 30, 2022 and placed on injured reserve. He was released on September 8.

NFL career statistics

Regular season

References

External links
Green Bay Packers bio
Florida Gators bio

1997 births
Living people
Florida Gators football players
Players of American football from Miami
American football safeties
Miami Southridge Senior High School alumni
Indianapolis Colts players
Green Bay Packers players